Socialist Lebanon (Lubnān al-ištirākī) was a Marxist group in Lebanon. The group was formed in 1965 by intellectuals and academicians including Ahmad Beydoun, Waddah Sharara, and Fawwaz Traboulsi.

In 1970 the group merged with the Organization of Lebanese Socialists, and formed the Communist Action Organization in Lebanon.

References

1965 establishments in Lebanon
1970 disestablishments in Lebanon
Arab nationalism in Lebanon
Arab socialist political parties
Ba'ath Party breakaway groups
Defunct political parties in Lebanon
Nationalist parties in Lebanon
Political parties disestablished in 1970
Political parties established in 1965
Socialist parties in Lebanon